Darien is an unincorporated community in Dent County, in the U.S. state of Missouri.

History
A post office called Darien was established in 1888, and remained in operation until 1954. The community was named after a place mentioned in the last line of the sonnet "On First Looking into Chapman's Homer".

References

Unincorporated communities in Dent County, Missouri
Unincorporated communities in Missouri